Jóhann Hafstein (19 September 1915 – 15 May 1980) was elected to the Althingi for Reykjavík in 1946, which he represented until 1978. Jóhann was prime minister of Iceland from 10 July 1970 to 14 July 1971, for the Independence Party. Member of the Althingi 1946–1978. Hafstein was Speaker of the Lower House of the Althingi 1959–1961 and 1962–1963. He was CEO of the Fisheries Bank from 1952 to 1963. He served as Minister of Justice, Religion and Industrial Affairs, as well as handling the Health portfolio in 1961 and again in 1963–1970. He attended the General Assembly of the United Nations in 1953, 1959 and 1974.

References

|-

Hafstein, Jóhann
Hafstein, Jóhann
Leaders of the Independence Party (Iceland)
Prime Ministers of Iceland
Speakers of the Althing